Within the motorsport discipline of rallying, Group Rally1 is a formula of rally car specifications for use at the highest level of international rallying in the World Rally Championship (WRC) as determined by the FIA. Despite the use of the word 'Group' in the name, there are not multiple classes or subclasses of car and so 'Rally1' may be used alone with the same definition. Rally1 cars were used for the first time in the 2022 WRC season and replaced the outgoing World Rally Car used in the manufacturer's championship. Though they may run on any individual rally as permitted by the organiser, they will not be used in any other championship.

The calls for new cars were made by the existing WRC competing manufacturers to reflect both changes in consumer marketing preferences, such as advancements in technology, and the need to reduce costs to make competing sustainable. The move to a new formula of car was approved in June 2018 along with a complete overhaul of cars and championships in the Rally Pyramid.

Regulations
Rally1 cars are defined in Article 262 of Appendix J of the International Sporting Code. The cars have two radical new features for rally cars in the World Rally Championship, the first being hybrid electric power units in use for the first time. The second, less obvious characteristic is that Rally1 cars are not needed to be homologated in Group A or N and have no series production car requirement with being 'Category II' purpose-built competition vehicles. However, they must be identifiable as being based on a series production model. Tubular space frame structures are permitted allowing for scaling of production models whilst production bodyshells will also be permitted as tradition. They will also feature common safety cell structures, centrally designed in partnership with the FIA. The existing 380hp 1.6L global race engine will continue to be used.

Other key features include:
 synthetic fuels, claimed to be sustainable and renewable
 Artificial Intelligence Safety Cameras (AISC), to monitor the special stage for safety purpose, eg. out of place spectators
 less complex suspension with reduced travel
 a reduction from 6 to 5 speed gearboxes, in common with Rally2 cars including the removal of 'flappy-paddle' gear shifters
 removal of the active central differential altogether
 ban on liquid cooled brakes
 simplified fuel tank shape
 simplified turbo
 removal of the fresh air valve in the anti-lag system
 removal of some aerodynamic components

The changes to aerodynamics remove expensive and commonly damaged parts such as the rear diffuser. Hidden ducts for cooling purposes are banned.

Hybrid system
The hybrid electric power system is supplied to all teams by a third party, Compact Dynamics, incorporating a battery supplied by Kreisel Electric. It is used to power the cars in 100% electric zones on liaison sections as set in the rally roadbook by the rally organiser. On the special stages it also provides a boost of up to 100 KW or 134 hp alongside the combustion engine and recuperates kinetic energy under braking. The driver will have three options to choose from to deploy the boost, with a further three options to choose on how to recuperate energy under braking. The driver must set these options before a special stage and are not able to choose when to deploy the electric boost within the stage. The hybrid electric system adds an extra 84kg to the cars gross weight and due to its 750-volts the cars will wear HY identification, with white letters on a red background, on the door panel. Crews are also required to carry high voltage gloves to use in the event of an issue.

FIA competition
Rally1 cars are only permitted in the World Rally Championship and when entered by the manufacturer teams. The cars may appear on other individual rallies when entered by the manufacturers but not under a championship point-scoring situation.

Cars

Notes

References

External links

 

 
Rally groups